Elwood Township is a township in Barber County, Kansas, USA.  As of the 2000 census, its population was 275.

Geography

Cook Lake is within this township. The stream of Dry Creek runs through this township.

References
 USGS Geographic Names Information System (GNIS)

External links
 US-Counties.com
 City-Data.com

Townships in Barber County, Kansas
Townships in Kansas